Alf Bakken (born 27 June 1962) is a Norwegian politician for the Progress Party.

He served as a deputy representative to the Parliament of Norway from Vestfold during the term 1989–1993. In total he met during 41 days of parliamentary session.

References

1962 births
Living people
Progress Party (Norway) politicians
Deputy members of the Storting
Vestfold politicians
Place of birth missing (living people)
20th-century Norwegian politicians